American film, television, and stage actress and director Sarah Paulson began her acting career in New York City stage productions before starring in the short-lived television series American Gothic (1995–1996) and Jack & Jill (1999–2001). Her other television work includes Deadwood (2005), Studio 60 on the Sunset Strip (2006–2007), and Cupid (2009). In 2011, Paulson began starring in the FX anthology series American Horror Story, playing various characters over the show's 10 seasons (2011–present). For her performances in the series, she received five Primetime Emmy Award nominations and won two Critics' Choice Television Awards. In 2016, she portrayed real life prosecutor Marcia Clark in The People v. O. J. Simpson: American Crime Story, for which she earned her a Primetime Emmy Award and the Golden Globe Award. In 2020, Paulson appeared in the FX miniseries Mrs. America, and began starring as Nurse Mildred Ratched in the Netflix psychological thriller series Ratched (2020–present).

Paulson's film roles include the romantic comedy films What Women Want with Mel Gibson (2000) and Down with Love with Renee Zellweger (2003), and the drama films Path to War with Michael Gambon (2002) and The Notorious Bettie Page with Gretchen Mol (2005). In 2008, she starred as Ellen Dolan in the superhero noir film The Spirit. She portrayed Mary Epps in the historical drama film 12 Years a Slave (2013), as Abby Gerhard in the romantic drama film Carol (2015), as Toni Bradlee in the political drama film The Post (2017), Jessica Hayes in the post-apocalyptic horror thriller film Bird Box and Ellie Staple in the superhero film Glass (2019).

Film

Television

Stage

Director

See also
List of awards and nominations received by Sarah Paulson

External links

Actress filmographies
American filmographies